Ellen Weeton (1777-1850) was a Lancashire school mistress and governess who was the author of Journal of a Governess, two volumes describing her life as a governess in the years 1807–1825.

She was born in Up Holland in Lancashire around 1777. She was very educated for a woman of the time, and was employed throughout her life as a school mistress and governess, one of the few respectable occupations available to a woman during this period.

Weeton was well travelled, visiting Yorkshire, the Lake District, North Wales, the Isle of Man, and London. She was also a keen walker, and her exploits included an ascent of Snowdon, which she climbed alone in June 1825, aged 48. On the Isle of Man, she records walking 35 miles in a day, and ascending Greeba.

Weeton married Aaron Stock in 1814, and a daughter, Mary, was born the following year. In 1821, Stock appeared in court for an assault on Weeton; she and her husband formally separated. Due to this, Weeton surrendered custody of her daughter, whom she would not see again until 1828.

Weeton published nothing in her lifetime; four volumes of her correspondence and some journals were gathered in 1936 and 1939 by Edward Hall, and were subsequently edited by JJ Bagley in 1969 as Miss Weeton's Journal of a Governess in two volumes.

Further reading
 Kerri Andrews: Wanderers : a history of women walking, London : Reaktion Books, 2020,

References 

1777 births
Women of the Regency era
English governesses
19th-century women educators
Walkers of the United Kingdom
1850 deaths